= Ummarun Kwabo =

Nigerian politician

Alhaji Dr Ummarun Kwabo AA

Jarman Sokoto

Personal details
- Born: March 10, 1954 Sokoto State, Northern Region, Nigeria
- Party: Peoples Democratic Party (PDP)

Ummarun Kwabo is a Nigerian politician, philanthropist and a business tycoon. And chairman of STCC Group of companies with morethan 10 companies venture into Building, transportation, oil and Gas, Real Estate, pharmaceutical, construction and General contractors

Jarma received the Peace Achievers International Award

== Orphanage ==
After Boko Haram destroyed Maiduguri, many children became orphans and started roaming on the street. In 2018, Jarma established an orphanage named UK Jarma Academy in Sokoto State were Kwabo dedicated his House in Abuja which he used to get rent fee of Sixty Million Naira annually to the orphanage and added it to his will for 200 orphans from Borno State, and Yobe State including 23 sokoto local governments for their education from primary to university level and made it publicly in an interview with Voice of America Hausa Section.

In 2017, he sponsored the wedding of 100 couples that cannot afford to get married in Sokoto State.
